The UK Energy Research Centre (UKERC) carries out world-class, interdisciplinary research into sustainable future energy systems. It's whole systems research programme addresses the challenges and opportunities presented by the transition to a net zero energy system and economy.

The centre is funded by the UK Research and Innovation Energy Programme. UKERC is a distributed centre with researchers at over 20 different institutions throughout the UK, its headquarters are based at University College London.  

Currently in its fourth phase of funding (2019-2024), UKERC’s activities are overseen by a committee consisting of the UKERC Director, Professor Rob Gross, and eleven Co-Directors, and is advised by an independent Advisory Board.

History
UKERC was established in April 2004, following a recommendation from the 2002 Energy Review initiated by Sir David King, the UK Government's Chief Scientific Advisor. The centre was set up to address key controversies in the energy field through comprehensive assessments of the current state of knowledge. The first phase of the Centre ran from 2004 - 2009.

In March 2009, £18.5 million was allocated to support the second phase of work at the UK Energy Research Centre for 2009 – 2014. Under the second phase of funding, UKERC focused on five themes: Energy Demand, Energy Supply, Energy Systems, Energy and Environment, and Technology and Policy Assessment.

In May 2014, the UK Energy Research Centre was awarded funding for a third phase of work, which ran from 2014 to 2019. This research programme focused on six core themes: future energy system pathways; resources and vectors; energy systems at multiple scales; energy, economy and societal preferences; decision making; technology, policy and assessment - with an HQ function aimed at engaging with the wider UK energy research community, policy makers and energy industry.

UKERC's interdisciplinary research studentships have enabled whole-systems interdisciplinary research across scientific, engineering and socio-economic boundaries.

Full details of all UKERC's activities and research output can be found at UKERC's website.

Current Activity
Currently in its fourth phase of funding, UKERC'S research programme encompasses a variety of different activities that address the challenges and opportunities presented by the transition to a net-zero energy system.

This research includes major themes on global energy challenges and their implications for the UK; the role of local and regional energy systems; interdependencies between energy systems and the environment; decarbonisation of specific sectors including transport, heat and industry; and transitions in energy infrastructures.

Alongside these activities UKERC undertakes systematic evidence reviews, hosts and curates energy data, maps and monitors public engagement with energy systems, and improves the transparency and understanding of energy models.

In July2022, the UKERC launched a socalled public engagement observatory designed to track public engagement efforts across the United Kingdom.

Recent Research
Energy Modelling in the UK: The modelling landscape. Neil Strachan and Pei-Hao Li, 2021.
Review of Energy Policy 2020. Rob Gross et al., 2020.
The Pathway to Net Zero Heating in the UK. Jan Rosenow et al., 2020.
Financing Community Energy Case Studies. Iain Cairns et al., 2020
Fostering Successful Policy Engagements: recommendations for PhD and ECR schemes. Sioned Haf et al., 2020.
Progressing New Voices and Gender Balance in Energy Research. Programme report, 2019.
Review of Energy Policy 2019. Jim Watson et al., 2019.

References

External links

British research associations
College and university associations and consortia in the United Kingdom
Engineering and Physical Sciences Research Council
Energy in the United Kingdom
Energy research institutes
Funding bodies in the United Kingdom
Knowledge transfer
Natural Environment Research Council
Research and development in the United Kingdom
Research institutes in the United Kingdom
Science and technology in the United Kingdom